Hoffmann's rat (Rattus hoffmanni) is a species of rodent in the family Muridae.
It is found only in Indonesia, and is located throughout Sulawesi, as well as Malenge island in the Togian Islands.

References

Rattus
Rats of Asia
Endemic fauna of Indonesia
Rodents of Sulawesi
Mammals described in 1901
Taxonomy articles created by Polbot